Panmure-Ōtāhuhu is an electorate to the New Zealand House of Representatives.

Population centres
The electorate consists of the mid-eastern part of the Manukau Ward, and a long strip of suburbs along the west bank of the Tāmaki River. It is located in south-central Auckland, along the thinnest section of the Auckland isthmus.

History
It was created in the 2019/20 redistribution. Initially it was proposed to keep the name of Manukau East, but the name of Panmure-Ōtāhuhu was adopted instead after a public consultation period.

Manukau East, Panmure-Otahuhu's predecessor, was, since its creation in 1996, a safe Labour seat, held in 2020 by Jenny Salesa. When Salesa contested the new electorate in the 2020 election she won again based on preliminary results, holding the seat for Labour.

Members of Parliament

As of  no candidates who have contested the Panmure-Ōtāhuhu electorate have been returned as list MPs.

Election results

2020 election

References

2020 establishments in New Zealand
New Zealand electorates in the Auckland Region